The Seychellense Ambassador in New York City is the official representative of the Government of in Victoria, Seychelles to the Government of the United States. They are Permanent Representative next the Headquarters of the United Nations.

List of representatives 

United States–Seychelles relations

References 

 
United States
Seychelles